Aaron Heywood is an Irish cricketer. He made his Twenty20 debut for North West Warriors in the 2017 Inter-Provincial Trophy on 11 August 2017.

References

External links
 

Year of birth missing (living people)
Living people
Irish cricketers
North West Warriors cricketers
Place of birth missing (living people)